Alfred Picard (21 March 1913 – 12 April 1945) was a German international footballer.

Personal life
Picard served as a leutnant (lieutenant) in the German Army during the Second World War and was killed in action on 12 April 1945. He is buried at Cloppenburg war cemetery.

References

1913 births
1945 deaths
Association football defenders
German footballers
Germany international footballers
SSV Ulm 1846 players
Place of birth missing
German Army officers of World War II
German Army personnel killed in World War II
People from Neustadt (Aisch)-Bad Windsheim
Sportspeople from Middle Franconia
Footballers from Bavaria
Military personnel from Bavaria